Kallithea is an Athens Metro Line 1 station, located in Kallithea, Athens and is also named after, 5.558 km from Piraeus. It is located in by the boundary with Kallithea. The station was first opened on 1 July 1928 and was renovated in 2004. The station contains two platforms.

References

External links
 

Athens Metro stations
Railway stations opened in 1928
1928 establishments in Greece
Kallithea